Sielbeck Forest Natural Area is an Illinois state park on  in Johnson County, Illinois, United States.

History 
Originally owned by Ruth and Louie Sielbeck, the land went on sale following Louie's death. The Nature Conservancy bought the land in 1997 and then sold it to the Illinois Department of Natural Resources the following year.

Activities 
Fishing, hiking, and daytime hunting are allowed. Common animal species caught include largemouth bass, bluegill, deer, squirrel, doves, rabbits, quail, ducks and turkey. There are no site specific regulations, only statewide ones. A hunter fact sheet can be found here.

References

State parks of Illinois
Protected areas of Johnson County, Illinois
1998 establishments in Illinois
Protected areas established in 1998
Nature reserves in Illinois